Empire Flat was a steamboat landing at Empire Flat on the east shore of the Colorado River, within Parker Strip, Arizona, in La Paz County, Arizona.

History
Empire Flat was the steamboat landing, 10 miles above Parker's Landing on the Colorado River.  This landing was for the Empire Flat Mines of the Bill Williams Mining District and its mining camp, in the Buckskin Mountains above the landing, in what  was then Yuma County, Arizona Territory.  The landing, mining camp and mines are shown in an 1866 map made by Edward Fairman, of the Martin & Company properties at Empire Flat and its mines, Aubrey City, along the Bill Williams River and at the Mineral Hill Mines.  The map shows the Empire Flat Mines where 9.2 miles by land south of Aubrey City, 10 miles to Empire Flat landing by the river.  The 1866 map shows Empire Flat landing had a camp, a corral and an Ore House, and Mexican packers camp in its 160-acre bounds.  Besides the camp, the mine had ore furnaces, blacksmith and engine house.

Later in the 1870s the landing had a five-stamp mill, to crush the gold-bearing copper ore, in a two-story open structure, a mess hall and a few huts for the mill hands.

The mines in this district were worked from the early 1860s into recent times.  But the last steamboats called at the landing in 1905 after the Arizona and California Railway arrived and bridged the Colorado River at nearby Parker, Arizona.

The Site Today
The site of the Empire Flat landing is within Parker Strip under the modern resorts there.

References

External links
  Official Map Of The Territory Of Arizona, With All The Recent Explorations. Compiled by Richard Gird C.E. Commissioner. Approved By John N. Goodwin, Governor. In Accordance With An Act Of The Legislature, Approved Oct. 23d. 1864. We hereby certify that this is the Official Map of the Territory of Arizona, and approve the same. Prescott October 12th 1865. (with signed seal dated 1863). Published By A. Gensoul, Pacific Map Depot. No. 511 Montgomery St. San Francisco. Lith. Britton & Co. San Francisco.  Accessed from www.davidrumsey.com, December 1, 2014. Shows location of Aubrey City, the Williams Fork District and other landings, settlements and the mining districts along the Colorado River and the interior of the territory in 1865.

Ghost towns in Arizona
Former populated places in La Paz County, Arizona
Port cities and towns in Arizona